Hum Hai Raahi Car Ke is a romantic comedy adventure film directed by Jyotin Goel that was released in India on 24 May 2013. It marks the debut of Dev Goel as a lead hero son of director Jyotin Goel. It is a remake of 2004 Hollywood comedy film Harold & Kumar Go to White Castle.

Cast
Dev Goel as Shammi Suri
Adah Sharma as Sanjana Mehra
Sanjay Dutt as Police Inspector Karate
Anupam Kher
Rati Agnihotri as Shammi's Mother
Chunky Pandey as Khukhri Thapa/Paaji
Juhi Chawla as Doctor
Samrat Mukerji as John

Soundtrack

Critical reception 
Reviews of Hum Hai Raahi Car Ke were poor. Koimoi gave the film 0.5 stars out of 5 and said the movie was "filled with boorish vagary." in.com gave the film only 1.5 stars out of 5 saying, "giving the name of an old hit a new twist isn't enough to guarantee success."

References

External links 
 

2013 films
2013 romantic comedy films
2010s Hindi-language films
Indian romantic comedy films